Rhode Island held elections for the Second Congress on October 18, 1790, about a month and a half after elections for the First Congress due to the late ratification of the Constitution.

See also 
 United States House of Representatives election in Rhode Island, August 1790
 United States House of Representatives elections, 1790 and 1791
 List of United States representatives from Rhode Island

Rhode Island 10
1790 10
United States House of Representatives 10